Xiamen Egret Island Football Club is a defunct Chinese football club that participated in the China League Two. The team was based in Xiamen, Fujian.

History
Xiamen Qudian F.C. was founded in October 2019. The club participated in Chinese Champions League in 2020 and was promoted to China League Two. In 2021, the club changed its name to Xiamen Egret Island F.C.

The club was dissolved after 2021 season.

Name history
2019–2020 Xiamen Qudian F.C. 厦门趣店
2021 Xiamen Egret Island F.C. 厦门鹭岛

References

External links
Soccerway

Defunct football clubs in China
Xiamen Egret Island F.C.
Association football clubs established in 2019
Association football clubs disestablished in 2022
Sport in Fujian
2019 establishments in China
2022 disestablishments in China